The Gympie Music Muster is an Australian music festival held in and around the Amamoor Creek State Forest at Amamoor Creek near Gympie, Queensland, Australia.

The Muster started as a community fundraiser in 1982 and has now grown to a four-day festival attracting musicians from across Australia and internationally. The 2015 Gympie Muster attracted a crowd of over 23,000.

A fundraising initiative of the Apex Club of Gympie, the Muster is a registered charity with all profits distributed among worthy community groups and charity partners, both locally and nationally. An ever-growing number of community groups are also involved in the staging of the event, and for most, it is their major fundraiser for the year. There is a real sense of community ownership in the Muster with now more than 35 local community groups involved in the event's success. It's also the second largest country music festival in Australia, after Tamworth.

History 
Since its inception, the Muster has raised more than $15,000,000 dollars for local community groups and charity partners Australia-wide.

In 2009 as part of the Q150 celebrations, the Gympie Music Muster was announced as one of the Q150 Icons of Queensland for its role as an "event and festival".

In 2020 the event was cancelled due to the COVID-19 pandemic in Australia. In 2021 the Muster was cancelled again due to COVID restrictions, the Queensland–New South Wales border being closed on 23 June. Greg Cavanagh, chairman of Gympie Music Muster, said in 2021 "We would put the entire future of this festival in jeopardy if we charged ahead this year ….", and "… it was simply too risky with most patrons and artists coming from outside of Queensland". The line-up in 2021 was to feature all Australian artists including: Troy Cassar-Daley, Kasey Chambers, Graeme Connors, Lee Kernaghan and Busby Marou.

Location 

The music festival is sited beside the Amamoor Creek State Forest. In 2012, a fully equipped field hospital was staffed in an effort to ensure safety and deal with medical emergencies.

The venue for The Muster is beside the picturesque Amamoor Creek State Forest in the Sunshine Coast hinterland, 40-kilometres southwest of Gympie. The event is family friendly with children under 12 admitted free.

There are over 50 hectares of well maintained, planned camping facilities, plenty of hot showers and toilets, and a central entertainment for those who want to immerse themselves in The Muster experience and facilities include food stalls, bars and baristas. The entry ticket price gives Muster patrons free camping and access to the multiple venues and all performances.

35 years of Mates, Music and Making a Difference 

In late August 2016, Australia's largest charity festival kicked off for four days of mates, music, and making a difference.

Celebrating its 35th year in 2016, the festival delivered Australian Music with 120 artists in over 300 performances across the multiple venues of the festival.

2016 headline acts included a who's who of Australia's biggest stars of Country Music including Kasey Chambers, John Williamson, Beccy Cole, The McClymonts, Troy Cassar-Daley and Adam Harvey. They were joined from Canada by Gord Bamford, Delta Blues artist Corey Harris and also from the US comedian Rodney Carrington plus a host of Aussie favorites including O’Shea, The Wolfe Brothers, Shane Nicholson and others.

Co-founder of The Gympie Muster and legendary country musician, Berard Webb of The Webb Brothers, says The Muster has always been about ‘mates, music and making a difference.’

Mates4Mates is Gympie Muster's charity partner for 2016. Mates4Mates supports current and ex-serving Australian Defence Force members (and their families) who have physical or psychological wounds, injuries or illnesses as a result of their service. They have Family Recovery Centres located in Brisbane, Townsville and Hobart.

Past Performers 
As well as mainstream Australian country the event showcases the breadth of contemporary Australian country: from folk and Bush ballad, to alternative country. Notable musical artists performing at the Muster in previous years include: Keith Urban, Rodney Carrington, Gord Bamford, Kasey Chambers, Troy Cassar-Daley, The McClymonts, Caitlyn Shadbolt.

See also

List of country music festivals
List of festivals in Australia
Country music

References

External links

2013 Gympie Music Muster Special on Ben Sorensen's REAL Country
2014 Gympie Music Muster Special on Ben Sorensen's REAL Country
Gympie Country Music Muster oral history 2 April 2003, State Library of Queensland

Blues festivals in Australia
Bluegrass festivals
Folk festivals in Australia
Music festivals established in 1982
Festivals in Queensland
Gympie
Country music festivals in Australia
Rock festivals in Australia